Colin Shindler (born 1949) is an English author, social historian and Affiliated Lecturer in History at Cambridge University.

Life and career
Born in Manchester, Colin Shindler graduated with a degree in History from Gonville and Caius College, Cambridge, where he later completed his PhD thesis on Hollywood and the Great Depression. Since 1998 he has been lecturing and teaching at Cambridge on films and American history.

He has written numerous books on British and American cultural history with an emphasis on the impact of sport and film on modern society. Manchester United Ruined My Life and Manchester City Ruined My Life are a pair of memoirs about his support for Manchester City. He also wrote the screenplay for the 1988 film Buster and worked as a television producer in England between 1977 and 1996.

His older brother is the lawyer Geoffrey Shindler.

He should not be confused with another English academic and historian, also called Colin Shindler, born in 1946, who specialises in the history of modern Israel.

Books
Hollywood Goes to War: Films and American Society, 1939–1952 1979, 2014
Buster: A Novel Based on His Own Original Screenplay 1988 
Hollywood in Crisis: Cinema and American Society, 1929–1939 1996
Manchester United Ruined My Life 1998 (memoir)
High on a Cliff 1999 (novel)
Fathers, Sons and Football 2001
First Love, Second Chance 2002 (novel)
George Best and 21 Others 2004
Garbo and Gilbert in Love: Hollywood's First Great Celebrity Couple 2005
The Worst of Friends: Malcolm Allison, Joe Mercer and Manchester City 2009
The Worst of Friends: The Betrayal of Joe Mercer 2011 (novel)
Manchester City Ruined My Life 2012 (memoir)
National Service: From Aldershot to Aden: Tales from the Conscripts, 1946–62 2012
The Professional Amateur: The Cricketing Life of Bob Barber 2015
Four Lions: The Lives and Times of Four Captains of England 2016
I'm Sure I Speak for Many Others ... : Unpublished Letters to the BBC 2017 (edited) 
Barbed Wire and Cucumber Sandwiches: The Controversial South African Tour of 1970 2020

References

External links
 
 

1949 births
Living people
Writers from Manchester
Alumni of Gonville and Caius College, Cambridge
Academics of the University of Cambridge
English memoirists
English historians
Cricket historians and writers
English sportswriters
English television producers
21st-century English novelists
Academics of the Institute of Continuing Education